"Fall in Love" is a song recorded by Swedish singer Benjamin Ingrosso. The song was released as a digital download in Sweden on 9 October 2015 and peaked at number 56 on the Swedish Singles Chart. The song was certified gold in Sweden in April 2017.

Music video
A music video to accompany the release of "Fall in Love" was first released onto YouTube on 9 October 2015 at a total length of three minutes and forty-nine seconds.

Track listing

Chart performance

Certifications

Release history

References

2015 singles
2015 songs
English-language Swedish songs
Benjamin Ingrosso songs
Swedish pop songs